Hexahydroxytriphenylene (HHTP) is any of a set of organic compounds consisting of a polycyclic aromatic hydrocarbon core—triphenylene—with six hydroxy group substituents attached to the rings. These compounds have found use as a component of two-dimensional polymers. The first covalent organic framework used this chemical as a monomer building block. It can be used for self-assembling metal–organic frameworks.

References 

Polycyclic aromatic compounds
Polyphenols